Shaggy rat may refer to:

Crawford-Cabral's shaggy rat or Crawford-Cabral's shaggy marsh rat (Dasymys cabrali), species of shaggy marsh rat endemic to north-eastern Namibia
Fox's shaggy rat (Dasymys foxi), species of rodent in the family Muridae. It is found only in Nigeria
Glover Allen's Shaggy rat, or Glover Allen's shaggy rat (Dasymys alleni),  a species of shaggy marsh rat indigenous to Mount Rungwe in south-western Tanzania
Montane shaggy rat (Dasymys montanus), species of rodent in the family Muridae. It is found in Uganda and possibly Democratic Republic of the Congo
Robert's shaggy rat (Dasymys robertsii), species of rodent in the genus Dasymys that lives in South Africa
Rwandan shaggy rat (Dasymys rwandae), species of shaggy marsh rat endemic to north-western Rwanda
Tanzanian shaggy rat (Dasymys sua), species of shaggy marsh rat endemic to eastern Tanzania
West African shaggy rat (Dasymys rufulus), species of rodent in the family Muridae

See also
Dasymys